Tage Fritjof Erlander (13 June 1901 – 21 June 1985) was a Swedish politician who served as Prime Minister of Sweden from 1946 to 1969. He was the leader of the Swedish Social Democratic Party and led the government for an uninterrupted tenure of 23 years, one of the longest in any democracy. This led to Erlander being known as "Sweden's longest Prime Minister" referring to both his physical stature –  – and tenure (the Swedish word  meaning both 'long' and 'tall').

Becoming a member of the World War II coalition government in 1944, Erlander rose unexpectedly to the leadership upon the death of Prime Minister Per Albin Hansson in October 1946, maintaining the position of the Social Democrats as the dominant party in the country. Known for his moderation, pragmatism and self-irony, Erlander often sought approval from the liberal-conservative opposition for his policies, de facto dropping all pretences of wide-scale nationalizations whilst introducing reforms such as universal health insurance, pension additions and a growing public sector, although stopping short of raising tax levels above the average OECD levels at the time. Until the 1960s, income taxes were lower in Sweden than in the United States.

For most of his time in power, Erlander ran a minority government of the Social Democrats. From 1951 to 1957, he instead ran a coalition with the Farmers' League. The Social Democrats held a majority of seats in the upper house for most of this time and this allowed Erlander to remain in power after the 1956 general election, when the right-wing parties won a majority. A snap election in 1958 then reversed this result.

In foreign policy, he initially sought an alliance of Nordic countries, but without success, instead maintaining strict neutrality while building up among the most impressive armed forces in the world (surpassed only by the United States, the Soviet Union and Israel in terms of per-capita spending), making the Swedish Air Force the third largest in the world, while ultimately rejecting nuclear capability, signing the nuclear non-proliferation treaty in 1968. Erlander's mandate coincided with the post–World War II economic expansion, in Sweden known as the record years, in which Sweden saw its economy grow to one of the ten strongest in the world, and subsequently joined the G10.

In the 1968 general election, he won his seventh and most successful victory, with the Social Democrats winning an absolute majority of the popular vote and seats in the lower chamber. Erlander resigned the following year during a process of major constitutional reform, and was succeeded by his long-time protégé and friend Olof Palme.

Biography
Tage Erlander was born in Ransäter, Värmland County, to Alma Erlander (née Nilsson) and Erik Gustaf Erlander. On his maternal grandmother's side, Erlander descended from the Forest Finns, who migrated to Värmland from the Finnish province of Savonia in the 17th century. As a student at Lund University Erlander was heavily involved in student politics and met many politically radical students. He graduated in political science and economics in 1928. From 1928 till 1929 he completed his compulsory military service in the Signal Corps and eventually went on to become a reserve Lieutenant. Erlander was a member of the editorial staff of the encyclopedia Svensk upplagsbok from 1929 to 1938.

Erlander was elected to the municipal council in Lund in 1930 and became a member of parliament in 1932, and was appointed a state secretary at the Ministry of Social Affairs in 1938. As state secretary at the Ministry of Social Affairs, Erlander was one of the most senior officials responsible for the establishment of internment camps in Sweden during World War II. In the camps, which were kept secret to the Swedish public, people from various ethnic minorities as well as political dissidents were interned, particularly Communists and Soviet Union sympathisers.

In 1942, State Secretary Erlander together with then Minister for Social Affairs Gustav Möller initiated a nationwide registration of the Swedish Travelers, a branch of the Romani people that has been resident in Sweden for 500 years. The purpose of the registration was, according to a newspaper article, to make the base for "radical measures" against this "bottom layer of the Swedish population". In Norway, similar lists were established that were handed over to the Nazis during the German occupation of Norway.

Premiership
 
Erlander ascended to the cabinet in 1944 as minister without Portfolio, a post he held to the next year, when he became minister of education and ecclesiastical affairs. When Prime Minister Per Albin Hansson suddenly died in 1946, Erlander unexpectedly was chosen as the successor and subsequently also as the leader of the party.

Retaining the positions of the Social Democrats from a potent Liberal opposition under Bertil Ohlin in his first election, he later formed a coalition with the Farmers' League between 1951 and 1957. His working relationship with the party's leader, Gunnar Hedlund (Minister for Home Affairs in the coalition government), is known to have been good.

Under Erlander, the central pillars of the Swedish welfare state were enacted between 1946 and 1947, a period known as the Social Democratic "Harvest Time." In 1946 and 1947, three major reforms were enacted that introduced a basic pension, general child allowances and sickness cash benefits. The National Housing Board was set up as the central authority providing subsidized loans and rent controls, while the National Labor Market Board was established to coordinate the nationalized local employment offices and supervise the union-controlled but state-subsidized unemployment insurance funds. In 1947, a tax reform was carried out that reduced income taxes in low-income brackets, introduced an inheritance tax, and raised the marginal tax rate for higher tax brackets.

In 1948, a general child allowance was made payable to all persons in Sweden with at least one child under the age of 16. In 1947, housing allowances for families with children were introduced. In 1954, housing allowances were introduced for pensioners. In 1960, the income-test for the children's pension was abolished. In 1950, a ten-year experimental period was established to build up a nine-year compulsory comprehensive school to replace the old parallel system. A law of 1955 provided state subsidies for municipally organized vocational schools, while a law of 1958 provided state subsidies for adult education centers. In 1962, a final decision was made on nine-year comprehensive school; implemented over a ten-year period. A law of 1964 revised upper secondary school; introduced special preparatory vocational school to complement the high school (gymnasium). A law of 1964 expanded higher education; new decentralized universities and colleges. A law of 1967 instituted municipal adult education. In 1955, medical insurance that provided earnings-related benefits was introduced, and the following year the Social Democrats sponsored a law on "social help" which further extended social services. A maternity allowance was introduced in 1962 that provided a six-month period of paid leave to new mothers, and a reform of unemployment benefits in 1968 doubled the maximum duration of such benefits from 30 to 60 weeks.

Erlander coined the phrase "the strong society", describing a society with a growing public sector taking care of the growing demand on many services that an affluent society creates. The public sector, particularly its welfare state institutions, grew considerably during his tenure as Prime Minister, while nationalizations were rare. In order to maintain employment for his vast electorate and Swedish sovereignty as a non-NATO member, the armed forces was greatly expanded, reaching an impressive level by the 1960s, while nuclear capability was ultimately dropped after outcries, not least from the Social Democratic Women's League.

The question of nuclear weapons as a means to deter a possible attack remained a divisive factor in Swedish society and among Social Democrats and prompted diplomatic agreements with the United States, guaranteeing intervention in the case of an invasion. Sweden signed the nuclear non-proliferation treaty in 1968, dropping all pretenses of developing a nuclear weapon.

Resigning at 68 in 1969, with an absolute majority for the Social Democrats in the second chamber since 1968, Erlander was succeeded by 42-year-old Olof Palme, who, although more radical, had in many ways been Erlander's student and protégé. From 1972 to 1982, Erlander published his memoirs in six volumes. He died on 21 June 1985 in Stockholm at the age of 84 from pneumonia and heart failure. After a ceremony in Stockholm, his funeral crossed the country and returned to his home town of Ransäter, Värmland, in a triumphant procession for the final rest.

Personal life
In 1930, he married Aina Andersson. He was the father of mathematician Sven Erlander, who published much of the content of his father's diaries from 2001 on.

Awards 
Erlander was awarded the Illis quorum in 1984.

Notelist

References

Further reading
 Ruin, Olof. Tage Erlander: serving the welfare state, 1946–1969 (University of Pittsburgh Press, 1989).
 Ruin, Olof. "Three Swedish Prime Ministers: Tage Erlander, Olof Palme and Ingvar Carlsson." West European Politics 14.3 (1991): 58–82.

External links

1901 births
1985 deaths
People from Munkfors Municipality
Prime Ministers of Sweden
Swedish Lutherans
Swedish Ministers of Education and Ecclesiastical Affairs
Leaders of the Swedish Social Democratic Party
Members of the Andra kammaren
Swedish memoirists
Lund University alumni
Swedish people of Forest Finnish descent
People from Värmland
People from Värmland County
20th-century memoirists
20th-century Lutherans
Recipients of the Illis quorum